Club Deportivo Benavente is a Spanish football club based in Benavente, in the autonomous community of Castile and León. Founded 1948, they play in Primera Regional – Group B, holding home games at Estadio Luciano Rubio, with a capacity of 3,500 people.

Season to season

21 season in Tercera División

References

External links
 
La Preferente team profile 

Football clubs in Castile and León
Association football clubs established in 1948
1948 establishments in Spain